Lai Chi Kok Central is one of the 25 constituencies in the Sham Shui Po District of Hong Kong which was created in 2015.

The constituency loosely covers Liberté, The Pacifica and Banyan Garden in Lai Chi Kok with the estimated population of 18,975.

Councillors represented

Election results

2010s

References

Constituencies of Hong Kong
Constituencies of Sham Shui Po District Council
2015 establishments in Hong Kong
Constituencies established in 2015
Lai Chi Kok